The 9th Kazakhstan President Cup was played from August 8 to August 12, 2016 in Shymkent. 8 youth teams participated in the tournament (players were born no earlier than 2000.)

Participants

Venues 
Matches of a group stage took place in the Field №7 and at Namys Stadium. The match for third place took place at BIIK FC, and the final at Kazhymukan Munaitpasov Stadium.

Format 
The tournament is held in two stages. At the first stage, eight teams are divided into two qualification groups (A and B). Competitions of the first stage were held on a circular system. The winners of the groups advance to the final, while the group runners-up meet to determine third place.

Squads

Group stage
All times UTC+6

Group A

Group B

Match for 7th place

Match for 5th place

Bronze medal match

Final

Statistics

Goalscorers 

7 goals
  Khagani Sadikhov

6 goals
  Kamran Guliyev(1 pen.)

3 goals
  Yerkebulan Seidakhmet
  Shakhrom Samiev

2 goals

  Ali Reza Asadabadi
  Yones Delfi
  Hossein Nokhatkhar
  Dmitry Bachek
  Denis Krasnoperov
  Gulzhigit Borubayev
  Syrgabolot Orozbek uulu
  Vahdat Hanonov(1 pen.)

1 goal

  Aldrit Oshafi(1 pen.)
  Shakir Seyidov
  Izzat Mushtagov
  Muhammad Maharramov
  Saeid Hosseinpour
  Vahid Namdari
  Mohammad Ghaderi
  Saeid Ahani
  Mohammad Sharifi(1 pen.)
  Taha Shariati
  Aref Mohammadalipour(1 pen.)
  Daryn Kainolla
  Dinmukhamed Karaman
  Damir Zhanbayev
  Dinmukhamed Kashken(1 pen.)
  Madi Zhakipbayev
  Ruslan Makhan
  Zhasulan Kairkenov
  Gulzhigit Alykulov
  Ryskeldi Artykbayev
  Goga Gogrichiani
  Khuvaylo Maliev
  Daler Edgorov

Awards 

The best player of a tournament
 Dinmukhamed Kashken
Goalscorer of a tournament
 Khagani Sadikhov (7 goals)
The best goalkeeper of a tournament
 Ilia Sinani
The best defender of a tournament
 Taha Shariati 
The best midfielder of a tournament
 Shakhrom Samiev
The best forward of a tournament
 Yerkebulan Seidakhmet

Prize money 
According to FFK, the prize fund of a tournament will make $15,000. "The teams which took 1, 2 and 3 place will be received, respectively 7,000, 5,000 and 3,000 $.

2016
2016 in Kazakhstani football
2016 in youth association football